Anders Henriksson (born 1981) is a Swedish poker player who won a bracelet at the World Series of Poker in 2006.

References 

Swedish poker players
1981 births
Living people
Date of birth missing (living people)